Edward George Napoleon (September 13, 1937 – April 28, 2020) was an American professional baseball player, manager and coach whose career lasted for over 45 years. During that period, he was a coach in Major League Baseball for five teams over 15 seasons.

Napoleon was born in Baltimore, Maryland. An outfielder during his active career, he played for the St. Louis Cardinals and Pittsburgh Pirates organizations from 1956 until 1970.

Napoleon became a minor-league manager for the Pirates' organization in 1970, helming their Rookie-level Gulf Coast League affiliate for four years. He then spent nine consecutive seasons in the New York Yankees' minor-league system, as a coach for West Haven of the Double-A Eastern League (1974–1975, 1979), Tacoma of the Triple-A Pacific Coast League (1978), and Nashville of the Double-A Southern League (1980–1982); in between, Napoleon managed Oneonta of the short-season New York–Penn League (1976) and Fort Lauderdale of the Class-A Florida State League (1977).

Napoleon reached the major leagues as a coach for the Cleveland Indians from 1983–1985, then managed Eugene of the Northwest League, short-season Class-A affiliate of the Kansas City Royals, in 1986. He returned to coach in the majors with the Royals from 1987–1988 and the Houston Astros in 1989–1990. He managed the Rookie-level Gulf Coast Orioles in 1991, then returned to MLB as a coach with the New York Yankees in 1992–1993 and the Texas Rangers from 1995–2000. He was retired from 2001–2003 before returning in 2004 as a special minor-league instructor with the Cincinnati Reds, serving until 2007.

References

External links

Retrosheet Directory of Major League Coaches

1937 births
2020 deaths
Ardmore Cardinals players
Asheville Tourists players
Baseball coaches from Maryland
Baseball players from Baltimore
Burlington Bees players
Chicago White Sox coaches
Cleveland Indians coaches
Dothan Cardinals players
Eugene Emeralds managers
Fort Lauderdale Yankees managers
Gastonia Pirates players
Houston Astros coaches
Kansas City Royals coaches
Kinston Eagles players
Major League Baseball bench coaches
Major League Baseball first base coaches
Minor league baseball coaches
New York Yankees coaches
Raleigh Pirates players
Salem Rebels players
Texas Rangers coaches
Winnipeg Goldeyes players
Winston-Salem Red Birds players
York Pirates players